Vepris arushensis is a species of plant in the family Rutaceae. It is endemic to Tanzania.

References

arushensis
Endemic flora of Tanzania
Vulnerable flora of Africa
Taxonomy articles created by Polbot